Hypatopa actes is a moth in the family Blastobasidae. It is found in Costa Rica.

The length of the forewings is about 4.5 mm. The forewings are pale brownish orange intermixed with brown scales. The hindwings are translucent pale brown.

Etymology
The specific name refers to the older name of Attica.

References

Moths described in 2013
Hypatopa